Kunegonda Elizabeth (Kune) Biezeveld (13 April 1948, The Hague – 7 September 2008, Hilversum) was a Dutch theologian. She was a member of the Dutch Reformed Church (since 2004 the Protestant Church in the Netherlands).

Biezeveld studied theology at Leiden University. Afterwards she was a minister in Zandvoort, Voorthuizen and in a hospital in Blaricum.

She took her Doctor of Theology in 1996. In the same year she became a lecturer dogmatics and Biblical theology at Leiden University. She became a personal professor in women's studies theology at the same university in 2002.

Biezeveld was especially interested in feminist theology. She had moderate views of this brand of theology and was in favour of a connection with classical theology.

Kune Biezeveld died at the age of 60 of pancreatic cancer.

Books
Spreken over God als vader. Hoe kan het anders?, 1996
Towards a Different Transcendence. Feminist Findings on Subjectivity, Religion and Values, with Anne-Claire Mulder, 2001
De splinter en het beeld. Het beeldverbod in klassieke en feministische theologie, oration Leiden University, 2002
 Als scherven spreken. Over God in het leven van alledag, 2008

References
Prof.dr. K.E. Biezeveld, Protestant Theological University at Leiden
Kune Biezeveld overleden, IKON, Sept 9, 2008

1948 births
2008 deaths
20th-century Dutch Calvinist and Reformed ministers
Dutch Calvinist and Reformed theologians
20th-century Calvinist and Reformed theologians
Leiden University alumni
Academic staff of Leiden University
Clergy from The Hague
Deaths from cancer in the Netherlands
Deaths from pancreatic cancer